The 17th Congress of the All-Union Communist Party (Bolsheviks) was held during 26 January – 10 February 1934. The congress was attended by 1,225 delegates with a casting vote and 736 delegates with a consultative vote, representing 1,872,488 party members and 935,298 candidate members.

Events
During the elections to the 17th Central Committee Stalin received a significant number (over a hundred, although the precise number is unknown) of negative votes, whereas only three delegates crossed out the name of the popular Leningrad party boss, Sergei Kirov.  The results were subsequently covered up on Stalin's orders and it was officially reported that Stalin also received only three negative votes.

During the Congress a group of veteran party members approached Kirov with the suggestion that he replace Stalin as the party leader. Kirov declined the offer and reported the conversation to Stalin.

In public Stalin was acclaimed, not merely as the leader of the party, but as a towering, universal genius in every human sphere.  All his former opponents spoke approvingly of him (other than Leon Trotsky, who had been exiled in 1929) and pledged their total support to the party line.

In his speech to the 20th Party Congress, Nikita Khrushchev reported that "of the 139 members and candidates of the Central Committee who were elected at the 17th Congress, 98 persons, i.e., 70 per cent, were arrested and shot (mostly in 1937-1938)." In addition, Khrushchev said that "of 1,966 delegates [to the 17th Congress] with either voting or advisory rights, 1,108 persons were arrested on charges of anti-revolutionary crimes, i.e., decidedly more than a majority."

At the congress Rabkrin was dissolved and its functions passed to the Sovnarkom's People's Control Commission.

"Just like in 1914, the parties of bellicose imperialism, the parties of war and revenge, are appearing in the foreground. It is very clear that we're facing a new war."
- Joseph Stalin, Report to the Seventeenth Congress of the CPSU, 1934

Agenda of the Congress

1. Reports by Stalin (Central Committee of the All-Union Communist Party (Bolsheviks)), Vladimirsky (Central Revision Committee). Rudzutak and Manuilsky

2. Second five-year plan, speakers: Molotov and Kuybishev

3. Organisational issues (party and Soviet construction), speaker: Kaganovich

4. Elections to the central organs of the Party

List of Elected Members of the Central Committee

Aftermath
After the results of the 17th Party Congress, on 1 December 1934, Sergei Kirov was shot and killed by Leonid Nikolaev. The assassination of Kirov following the Congress would be a bellwether for the Great Purge of 1937-1938.

See also
Congress of the Communist Party of the Soviet Union

References

Armstrong, John A. 1961. The Politics of Totalitarianism: The Communist Party of the Soviet Union, 1934 to the Present. New York: Random House.
Fitzpatrick, Sheila. 1994. The Russian Revolution, Second Edition. New York: Oxford University Press.
 
 Resolutions and Decisions, Including Party Rules adopted by the 17th Congress.

Communist Party of the Soviet Union 17
Congress
1934 conferences
January 1934 events
February 1934 events